Jason Stoltenberg and Todd Woodbridge successfully defended their title, defeating David Rikl and Tomáš Zdražila in the final, 6–4, 1–6, 7–5 to win the boys' doubles tennis title at the 1988 Wimbledon Championships.

Seeds

  Jason Stoltenberg /  Todd Woodbridge (champions)
  Zeeshan Ali /  Goran Ivanišević (first round)
  Andrei Cherkasov /  Vladimir Petrushenko (quarterfinals)
  Cristian Brandi /  Cristiano Caratti (semifinals)
  David Rikl /  Tomáš Zdražila (final)
  Colin Beecher /  Mark Petchey (quarterfinals)
  Martin Blackman /  Jared Palmer (second round)
  Johan Anderson /  Richard Fromberg (first round, withdrew)

Draw

Finals

Top half

Bottom half

References

External links

Boys' Doubles
Wimbledon Championship by year – Boys' doubles